"God Is a Bullet" is a song from American alternative rock band Concrete Blonde, which was released in 1989 as the lead single from their second studio album Free. The song was written and produced by the band. "God Is a Bullet" reached number 15 on the US Billboard Modern Rock Tracks chart.

Background
Concrete Blonde were inspired to write an anti-gun song after witnessing shootings and other gun-related incidents first-hand as residents of Los Angeles. The song was written in about 1987. Napolitano told The Ottawa Citizen in 1989, "This country has seen too many John Wayne movies. We were rehearsing one day and someone shot all the windows out of my car. Another day I was driving down the street to park it and I saw someone pull a gun on a guy. I had to keep on driving with my head under the dash hoping that he wouldn't come after me because I saw him do it. You hear guns going off all the time. We've become used to it in L.A. which means it's out of hand."

Music video
The song's music video was directed by Jane Simpson. It achieved breakout rotation on MTV, but received some resistance from the channel, who wanted the band to provide a new video for the track. Napolitano revealed to The Ottawa Citizen, "They want us to remake it. MTV won't take the video off, but they won't play it any more either. It's a very strong thing."

Critical reception
On its release, FMQB wrote, "Napolitano sneers and pants the words and by the instrumental break, the band sinks into a wonderful groove and some twisted guitar." Chris Willman of the Los Angeles Times described "God Is a Bullet" as a "hard rocking, pleading lament" with a "'Peter Gunn'-like bass theme [and] a "sirenlike guitar riff". Jim Sullivan of The Boston Globe considered it to be "a fierce, catchy, anti-gun madness song written well before the current sniper madness began [but] coincidentally topical."

In a review of Free, David Okamoto of the St. Petersburg Times wrote, "The standout is 'God Is a Bullet,' a passionate statement that employs chugging 'Peter Gunn' guitars to drive Napolitano's chilling vignettes and remorse for such slain heroes as John Lennon, Martin Luther King Jr. and Harvey Milk." Gene Armstrong of The Arizona Daily Star considered the song to be "sinister" and one which "rides a creepy guitar-bass line that recalls the themes from 'Batman' and 'Peter Gunn'." John Kendle of The Winnipeg Sun stated the song is an "anti-gun reworking of the riff from the Batman theme, marked by Napolitano's throaty, she-cat-on-the-prowl vocals".

Formats

Personnel
Credits are adapted from the German CD single liner notes and the Free CD album booklet.

God Is a Bullet
 Johnette Napolitano – vocals
 Jim Mankey – guitars
 Allan Bloch – bass
 Harry Rushakoff – drums

Production
 Concrete Blonde – producers ("God Is a Bullet", "Free", "Little Wing")
 Earle Mankey – recording ("God Is a Bullet", "Free", "Little Wing"), producer ("Free"), mixing ("Free", "Little Wing")
 Chris Tsangarides – mixing ("God Is a Bullet")

Other
 Johnette Napolitano – sleeve
 Jane Simpson – video stills
 William Herrón of Los Illegals – original art

Charts

References

1989 songs
1989 singles
Concrete Blonde songs
Songs written by Johnette Napolitano
I.R.S. Records singles